Christianity in Azerbaijan is a minority religion. Christians who estimated between 280,000 and 450,000 (3.1%–4.8%) are mostly Russian and Georgian Orthodox and Armenian Apostolic. There is also a small Protestant Christian community which mostly came from Muslim backgrounds.

History 
Christianity spread to territory of present-day Azerbaijan in the first years of the new era. The first stage of this period is called the period of Apostles Bartholomew and Thaddeus (same ones who Christianized Armenia), who spread the new religion by the benediction of the first patriarch of Jerusalem Yegub.

Eastern Orthodoxy

Adherents of Eastern Orthodox Christianity in Azerbaijan are mainly ethnic Russians and Georgians. Russian Orthodox communities belong to the Russian Orthodox Church in Azerbaijan. Entire territory of Azerbaijan is under ecclesiastical jurisdiction of the Russian Orthodox Eparchy of Baku and Azerbaijan, centered in the Holy Myrrhbearers Cathedral in Baku.

Oriental Orthodoxy
Adherents of Oriental Orthodox Christianity in Azerbaijan are mainly ethnic Armenians. The Armenian Apostolic Church currently has no community outside the Nagorno-Karabakh Republic. Before the outbreak of the war, Armenians formed the largest Christian population in the country. Today, Armenian churches in Azerbaijan remain closed, because of the large emigration of Armenians and fear of Azerbaijani attacks. During the First Nagorno-Karabakh War, despite the constitutional guarantees against religious discrimination, numerous acts of vandalism against the Armenian Apostolic Church were reported throughout Azerbaijan. At the height of the Baku pogrom in 1990, the Armenian Church of St. Gregory Illuminator was set on fire, but was restored in 2004 and is not used anymore.

Other denominations
There is only one congregation in the Catholic Church in Azerbaijan: a church in Baku was opened in 2007.

There are eleven Molokan communities. The Molokans are a Protestant minority which, much like other Protestants, center their beliefs on the Bible and reject church hierarchy. There is also a German Lutheran community, likely to number less than 7,000 Protestants. According to Rev. Elnur Jabiyev, the former general secretary of the Baptist Union in Azerbaijan, up to 2010, there were eight or nine evangelical churches in Baku but these have now been prevented from openly meeting together by the authorities.

2.5% of the population belong to the Russian Orthodox Church (1998). The Russian Orthodox Church in Azerbaijan has the Eparchy of Baku and the Caspian region with a seat in Azerbaijan. Among the famous landmark Russian churches are Church of Michael Archangel and the Holy Myrrhbearers Cathedral; the once grand Alexander Nevsky Cathedral has been destroyed by the communists in 1937.

The Albanian-Udi Church, established in 2003, is of the Udi people minority in Azerbaijan.

There is also a Georgian Orthodox community and churches.

See also
Church of Caucasian Albania
Russian Orthodox Church in Azerbaijan
Georgian Orthodox Church in Azerbaijan
Catholic Church in Azerbaijan
Molokan
Religion in Azerbaijan
Christianity by country

Notes

Further reading

Adherents.com - Religion by Location: Azerbaijan